The Frasnian is one of two faunal stages in the Late Devonian Period. It lasted from  million years ago to   million years ago. It was preceded by the Givetian Stage and followed by the Famennian Stage.

Major reef-building was under way during the Frasnian Stage, particularly in western Canada and Australia.  On land, the first forests were taking shape. In North America, the Antler orogeny peaked, which were contemporary with the Bretonic phase of the Variscan orogeny in Europe.

The Frasnian coincides with the second half of the "charcoal gap" in the fossil record, a time when atmospheric oxygen levels were below 13 percent, the minimum necessary to sustain wildfires.

North American subdivisions of the Frasnian include
 West Falls Group
 Sonyea Group
 Genesee Group

Name and definition 
The Frasnian Stage was proposed in 1879 by French geologist Jules Gosselet and was accepted for the lower stage of the Upper Devonian by the Subcommission on Devonian Stratigraphy in 1981. It is named after the village of Frasnes-lez-Couvin in Belgium.

References 

 
Late Devonian
Devonian geochronology
.